Anvil Island, is the third-largest of the islands in Howe Sound, British Columbia, Canada, and the northernmost of the major islands in that sound.  The island is part of West Howe Sound, Electoral Area F within the Sunshine Coast Regional District (SCRD) on the Sunshine Coast.

It is located northeast of Gambier Island and southwest of Britannia Beach and west of Porteau Cove.  The Defence Islands are to its northeast and are Indian Reserves of the Squamish Nation. A summer camp, Daybreak Point Bible Camp, operates on the south of the island, and some summer homes are located there.

Name origin
The name was conferred on June 14, 1792, by Captain George Vancouver, whose journal for the day reads:
"The sun shining at this time for a few minutes afforded an island which, from the shape of the mountain that composes it, obtained the name of Anvil island."

The indigenous Squamish name for the island is Lhaxwm. It was an important place of spiritual training. In mythology, a serpent resided at the peak of the island.

Terrain

The terrain of Anvil Island is mostly cliffs and hills. Starting at the south-side of the island it is more of a flat and plain terrain. At the very tip is Irby point. 'The Point' as it is often referred to by the local population, is the place where most of the deer would go to feed. Going west along the coast of the south-side, there is Daybreak Point where a Bible Camp is located.

People
Anvil Island has a small population living on the island year-round, and is mostly populated during the summer.

References

Leading Peak in the Canadian Mountain Encyclopedia

Islands of British Columbia
Sea-to-Sky Corridor
Sunshine Coast Regional District